The 12 Hours of Sebring Grand Prix of Endurance, was the third round of the 1989 IMSA GT Championship and was held at the Sebring International Raceway, on March 18, 1989. Victory overall went to the No. 83 Electramotive Engineering Nissan GTP ZX-Turbo driven by Chip Robinson, Geoff Brabham, and Arie Luyendyk.

Race results

Class winners in bold.

References

IMSA GTP
12 Hours of Sebring
12 Hours of Sebring
Sebring
12 Hours of Sebring